Green Lantern Corps is the name of a fictional intergalactic law enforcement organization appearing in comics published by DC Comics. They patrol the farthest reaches of the DC Universe at the behest of the Guardians, a race of immortals residing on the planet Oa. According to DC continuity, the Green Lantern Corps has been in existence for three billion years. Currently operating amongst the 3600 "sectors" of the universe, there are 7204 members (known commonly as Green Lanterns). There are two lanterns for every sector, with the exception of sector 2814, which has six members. Each Green Lantern is given a power ring, a weapon granting the use of incredible abilities that are directed by the wearer's own willpower.

Publication history
In 1959, during a revival of the popularity of superhero comics in America, DC Comics' editor Julius Schwartz decided to reinvent the 1940s superhero character Green Lantern as a science fiction hero. Schwartz's new conception of Green Lantern had a different name (Hal Jordan), costume, and origin story, and no connection to the original Green Lantern. Whereas the Green Lantern of the 1940s was a lone vigilante who only had adventures on Earth, the new Green Lantern was but one of a group of interstellar lawmen who all called themselves Green Lanterns. The group is first mentioned in Showcase #22 (1960) when a dying Green Lantern passes on his ring to Hal Jordan. Over the years, writers have introduced a large cast of Green Lanterns in both supporting and starring roles.

Fictional group history

Guardians

The Guardians of the Universe are one of several races that originate on the planet Maltus and are among the first intelligent life forms in the universe. At this time, they are short greyish blue humanoids with black hair. They become scientists and thinkers, experimenting on the worlds around them. In a pivotal moment billions of years ago, a Maltusian named Krona uses time-bending technology to observe the beginning of the universe. However, this test unleashes disaster upon all existence. Originally, the experiment splinters the universe into the multiverse and creates the evil anti-matter universe. Following the retroactive destruction of the Multiverse, it is revealed that Krona flooded the beginning of the universe with entropy causing it "to be born old".

Krona's experiment also draws Volthoom, a traveler from the multiverse looking to save his Earth. He brings with him the Travel Lantern, powered by the Emotional Spectrum. Through working with Volthoom the future Guardians shed their emotions into The Great Heart and inadvertently create the First Ring. Volthoom receives this ring and has the Great Heart implanted in his chest, controlling the whole emotional spectrum makes him dangerous. The future guardians destroy his Travel Lantern further escalating the situation. Future Guardian Rami uses the pieces of the Travel Lantern to create the first seven green lantern rings and imprison the First Lantern Volthoom. Soon after, it is decided that the emotional spectrum is at present too dangerous to wield.

The male Maltusians argued about how to deal with the situation. One group decides to dedicate their eternal existences to contain evil; this group fractures into the Guardians of the Universe and the Controllers. Later a single male Guardian becomes the Pale Bishop and founds The Paling, an anti-emotion faith. The females, however, see no need to involve themselves and, since the Oans are by then immortal and have no longer need to reproduce, leave their mates and become known as the Zamarons, later founding the Star Sapphires. Relocating to the planet Oa at "the center of the universe", the Guardians dedicate themselves to combatting evil and creating an orderly universe. During this period, they slowly evolve into their current appearance.

A Green Lantern's only weakness is the yellow energy of fear, opposite to the green energy of will. After the Green Lantern Sinestro betrays the Green Lantern Corps and creates the Sinestro Corps, a prophecy is fulfilled that Lantern Corps of the other cosmic energies of other emotions shall form, such as Red (rage), Orange (greed), Black (death), White (life), Indigo (compassion), Blue (hope), and Violet (love).

Manhunters and the Massacre of Sector 666

In their first attempt to enforce their will and guard against all menaces, about 3.5 billion years ago the Guardians of the universe create the Manhunters, a legion of robotic sentinels. At first serving faithfully to enforce order, in time the Manhunters come to resent their servitude and the moral restrictions the Guardians decreed of them. They are also found to be inherently flawed due to their inability to recognize or feel emotions. They rebel against the Guardians and fight a millennia-long war that culminates with an attack on the planet Oa. The Guardians overcome their android servants, strip them of their power, and banish them across the universe. Eventually, the surviving Manhunters form their own robotic society and pursue their own interpretation of their original mission (which often includes interfering with and foiling the plans of the Guardians).

In the Martian Manhunter series, the Guardians first get the idea for an intergalactic police force from the Martians' own Manhunters. They offer the Martian race the opportunity to be that force. The Martians turn it down, but the Guardians take the name for the androids.

In Geoff Johns' 2008 storyline "Green Lantern: Secret Origin", it is revealed that the Manhunters suffer from a malfunction in their logic that lead them to believe that order can only be achieved by eliminating all life. They rampage through Sector 666, massacring trillions in the process. The only survivors band together to form the Five Inversions, swearing revenge on the Guardians for the actions of their creations. One of the five, Atrocitus, later becomes the leader of the Red Lantern Corps.

It is later discovered that the Manhunters had not suffered a flaw in their logic, as had previously been assumed, but that the renegade Guardian Krona had reprogrammed them in an attempt to show the other Guardians the necessity in embracing emotions.

Creation of the Corps
Chastened by the failure of the Manhunters, the Guardians decide that their newest force of soldiers for good will consist of living beings, ones who have free will and strong moral character. A brief first attempt is the Halla, who are given the energy guns and the power batteries of the Manhunters to serve them in their goal. Soon the Guardians decide to discontinue this organization, the last of their number being Kendotha Kr'nek who served three and a half to three billion years ago in the war against Apokolips.

To arm this new legion of celestial knights, the Guardians create the Power Rings, rings of inconceivably-advanced technology that allow their wearers to project green beams of energy with which the bearer could conjure objects of any size or shape, limited only by their imagination and willpower. This begins with the selection of Rori Dag who becomes the first member of the 3600 Green Lantern Corps.

Crisis and aftermath
Both the Corps and the Guardians suffer casualties during the Crisis on Infinite Earths. The Guardians' failure to take appropriate action during the Crisis leads to their decision to depart Oa in the company of their female counterparts, the Zamarons. Left to their own devices, the Corps undergo a major reorganization. A team of Green Lanterns led by Hal Jordan is stationed on Earth, and the system of assigning one Green Lantern to a sector is temporarily abandoned. The decision of the Corps to execute Sinestro results in the activation of a previously unknown fail-safe that depowers the rings of every Green Lantern except for Hal Jordan, Guy Gardner, Gnort, and Ch'p.

The Guardians eventually return to Oa and begin the reconstruction of the Corps, assigning Guy Gardner to Earth, John Stewart to the Mosaic World, and Hal Jordan to recruit new members. Ironically, Jordan himself is eventually responsible for destroying the incarnation of the Corps that he helped create.

Fall of the Corps
The Green Lantern Corps patrol the DC Universe for over three billion years. In that vast length of time, some Green Lanterns rebel and turn against the Corps. A rogue Green Lantern, Universo, exists in the future epoch of the Legion of Super-Heroes. Two of the most important fallen Lanterns are Sinestro, the rogue Green Lantern, and Hal Jordan, who unknowingly becomes possessed by Parallax, the ancient fear-parasite trapped in the Battery. At the ruins of his home Coast City, Jordan is consumed by grief, which in turn allows him to be overcome by fear—all the while not knowing that his fear is tainted by the creature Parallax. This was planned by Sinestro while he was imprisoned in the Battery.

The Green Lantern Corps ranks are decimated by the Parallax-possessed Jordan. The Corps' power source, the Central Power Battery, is drained by Jordan and destroyed, removing the original power source for the rings. One Guardian, Ganthet, survives Jordan's onslaught, and chooses a young human artist, Kyle Rayner, as the sole Green Lantern of the Corps. Rayner eventually becomes Parallax's nemesis, and during their first battle, Rayner intentionally triggers a chain reaction in Oa's core, causing the planet to explode.

After the fall of the Corps, other organizations try to fill in the power vacuum left by the Guardians. Two organizations have initial notable successes: the Darkstars and L.E.G.I.O.N. However, neither ever achieve the power and reach of the Green Lantern Corps.

Rebuilding the Green Lantern Corps

Kyle Rayner accidentally travels through time to ten years in the past and meets a young Hal Jordan. After the two defeat Sinestro together, the Guardians send Rayner back to his own time by using the power from the Central Battery. However, while doing so, Sinestro uses his Qwardian ring to force Jordan to Rayner's time portal, stranding Jordan in Rayner's time period. Upon learning his future as Parallax (not knowing, however, that his future self's actions are the result of being possessed by Parallax) and aware that the future needs him to return to his own time, young Jordan knows he must forget everything he learned from the present, and gives Rayner a copy of his ring to restart the Green Lantern Corps in a bid to undo some of the damages he knows he is going to make once he returns to the past.

Rayner then gives the ring to Jennifer-Lynn Hayden, daughter of the elder Green Lantern Alan Scott. She becomes the first female Green Lantern of Earth, following in her father's footsteps, after he made another copy with it. In Green Lantern: The New Corps, during his weeks-long adventure in space, Rayner recruits Magaan Van'n Intraktus of the planet Van'n, Hammeroon, a bounty hunter from Ilskado System, Anya Savenlovich, a lieutenant colonel from the Soviet Air Forces who was in suspended animation after participating in a space mission in 1964, Garl Rathbone, a miner from the debris belt over the planet Daffith, and Sool, a judge from Daffith.

However, the group later realizes Van'n Intraktus is a traitor who enslaved his home planet with his ring and began invading other worlds. The Green Lanterns stop him after a battle, but at the cost of one of their own: Hammeroon. Rayner then realizes that he cannot be the only one to choose whom to wear the rings, and takes all of the power rings back from the Green Lanterns until the time is right for the Corps' rebirth. After erecting a memorial for Hammeroon, Rayner returns to Earth. The former Green Lanterns, despite being stripped of their rings, decide to continue their intergalactic adventures.

Rebirth of the Corps
In an attempt to redeem himself after his actions as Parallax, Hal Jordan sacrifices his life reigniting the sun, whereupon Oa and the Central Power Battery are completely rebuilt by the physical manifestation of Jordan's dying will channeled through his old friend Thomas Kalmaku. Shortly after, Kyle Rayner, imbued with the power of Ion after his battle with Oblivion and Alexander Nero, funnels the remaining energy left in the sun that was once the Guardians back into the Central Power Battery. This allows them to be reborn as children of both genders. After Hayden regains her Starheart powers and becomes the superheroine Jade once more, Rayner gives the ring to John Stewart. After Oa's return, Kilowog is eventually resurrected. With everything in place, Ganthet, Kilowog, Stewart, and Rayner make plans to rebuild the Corps once more.

It is later revealed that Hal Jordan was possessed by the living embodiment of fear, an ancient parasite called Parallax. Parallax had been imprisoned within the Central Power Battery for billions of years and is the mysterious "Yellow Impurity" within the Corps' green light that leaves them vulnerable against yellow. Hal Jordan, upon learning the truth about Parallax, separates himself from it and is reborn as a Green Lantern once again. Jordan, with the help of John Stewart, Guy Gardner, Kyle Rayner, and Kilowog, re-imprison Parallax. Upon Parallax's return to the Central Power Battery, the Guardians continue the re-construction and expansion of the Green Lantern Corps, with their power rings now able to directly affect yellow. This new Corps, under the training of Kilowog, Kyle Rayner, Guy Gardner, and other veterans, is primarily composed of new recruits. Only a handful of veteran Lanterns remain in the ranks. Each sector has two Lanterns assigned to protect it (with Hal Jordan and John Stewart assigned as the protectors of Sector 2814, Guy and Kyle acting as 'elite' members responsible for training). Due to an ancient pact with the Spider Guild, the Vega star system is off limits to all members of the Corps.

The new Green Lantern Corps lacks both the manpower and the political influence it once had due to its years-long absence from many sectors. This leaves the Corps unable to intervene in situations it might have before Parallax destroyed the old Corps, including conflicts such as the Rann-Thanagar War. The Guardians remain staunchly uninvolved in what they see as a conflict that could destabilize many sectors, but that does not stop Kyle Rayner and Kilowog from helping refugees.

Despite these difficulties, the Corps plays a key role in defeating Superboy-Prime. Several Lanterns are killed slowing the renegade Superboy's advance on Oa, a sacrifice that enables Earth's most powerful heroes to execute their plan to restrain him. Mogo, a sentient planet and Corps member, positions himself to act as a final battleground between Superboy-Prime and two Supermen. Responsibility for imprisoning Superboy-Prime is undertaken by the Guardians who charge the Corps with its undertaking, incarcerating him inside a small red Sun-Eater with fifty Green Lanterns on constant guard duty. "Prime Duty" is considered one of the lowlier functions of the Corps, and Guy Gardner is sentenced to a month of such duty for one of his frequent rules infractions.

As of the "One Year Later" timeframe, the Green Lantern Corps has increased its numbers, with many former trainees now full-fledged officers. A lack of truly experienced lanterns remains an issue, with Guy Gardner being called upon often to assist the rookies.

The Lost Lanterns

The Lost Lanterns are a group of Green Lanterns that tried to stop Parallax from reaching Oa. Parallax defeats them in space and after Parallax destroys the Corps, they are assumed to be dead. Instead, they were captured by the Manhunters and taken to Biot, the Manhunter homeworld in Sector 3601. They are used in various experiments to design and power new Manhunter models. They are eventually found and rescued by the resurrected Hal Jordan and Guy Gardner. They rejoin the Corps, albeit with some difficult adjustment. Despite learning of Parallax's possession of Hal Jordan, many still wrongly blame him for their captivity and cluster to themselves when summoned to Oa.

Sinestro Corps War

Rogue Green Lantern Sinestro, working with the Anti-Monitor, creates his own version of the Corps. Dubbed the "Sinestro Corps", it recruits beings capable of generating great fear. One of its members is Amon Sur, the son of former Green Lantern Abin Sur, who holds a grudge against Hal Jordan for being chosen to bear his father's ring instead of him. Armed with yellow Power Rings and Lanterns manufactured on Qward, the Sinestro Corps stage an attack on Oa, killing dozens of Green Lanterns, kidnapping Kyle Rayner, and freeing Superboy-Prime, Parallax, and the Cyborg Superman from the Corps' supervision.

As the Sinestro Corps' campaign of terror spreads, the Guardians, in desperation, rewrite the first Law of Ten in the Book of Oa, enabling the remaining Lanterns to use lethal force against members of the Sinestro Corps. This law later expands to include all adversaries of the Green Lanterns, though the law does not extend to cold-blooded killing of defenceless adversaries. This distinction plays a part in the expulsion of Green Lantern Laira, who kills Amon Sur when he is unarmed. She joins the Red Lanterns after this, and dies during the Sinestro Corps War and Blackest Night storylines.

Blackest Night

Hidden in the Book of Oa is the forbidden chapter of Cosmic Revelations, which contains a prophecy called the "Blackest Night". In the prophecy, seven different colored corps are at war with each other, eventually destroying one another and the universe.

Following the Sinestro Corps War, Ganthet and Sayd are banished from the Guardians. Realizing that the "Blackest Night" prophecy will come to be, they create a blue ring powered by hope. The remaining Guardians create the Alpha-Lanterns and reveal new laws they've written to the Green Lantern Corps.

During the Blackest Night, the Guardians finally realize the accuracy of the prophecy and are imprisoned by Scar; a rogue Guardian who launches an attack on the Corps by reviving deceased members as Black Lanterns. Command falls to Guy Gardner, Kyle Rayner, and Salaak, a senior Lantern holding the rank of Clarissi.

The Green Lantern corps, along with the other six corps (the Star Sapphires, The Sinestro Corps, the Red Lantern Corps, Agent Orange, The Blue Lantern Corps, and The Indigo Tribe), fight the black lanterns to regain safety and order in the universe.

The Blackest Night ends when Hal Jordan, merged with the Life Entity, and the recently created White Lantern Corps defeat Nekron and banish him from the realm of the living.

Brightest Day

At the end of "Blackest Night", 12 heroes and villains were resurrected for some unknown purpose. The events of Brightest Day follow the exploits of these heroes and villains as they attempt to learn the secret behind their salvation. It is revealed that the 12 resurrected must complete an individual assignment given to them by the White Lantern Entity. If they are successful, their life will be fully returned.

In New Mexico, Sinestro discovers a White Lantern battery which no lantern can move. Boston Brand aka Deadman is made the first White Lantern picking up the White Lantern battery and is charged by the Life Entity to find a new champion who will bear the white light of life and take the Entity's place. This turns out to be Alec Holland, the new Swamp Thing who defeats the Dark Avatar saving Earth.

Hal Jordan, as well as the representatives of the other Lantern Corps attempt to prevent the capture of all the emotional entities which eventually leads to the Green Lantern Corps War.

John Stewart, Kyle Rayner, and Ganthet face the revolt of the Alpha Lanterns and later fight the Weaponer of Qward wielding a shield made from Boston Brand's White Lantern ring.

Guy Gardner explores the unknown sectors and continues a secret pact with Ganthet and Atrocitus. As Guy leaves Oa, Kilowog and Arisia join up to aid him in his search, as they put in motion a universe-saving plan against a new, hidden foe who meanwhile, pulls Sodam Yat out of Daxam's sun taking the Ion entity.

War of the Green Lanterns 
After the Blackest Night, Hal Jordan forms a loose alliance with Carol Ferris, Sinestro, Atrocitus, Larfleeze, Saint Walker and Indigo-1 to find and protect the emotional entities, who have been kidnapped by a mysterious villain. The kidnapper is revealed to be Krona, who is also revealed to be the one who caused the Manhunters to go on a rampage in the first place.

Carol, Sinestro, Atrocitus, Larfleeze, Saint Walker, and Indigo-1 are trapped within the Book of the Black. However, Hal escapes from Salaak and his Green Lantern squad, who tried to arrest him, and takes their rings. Krona begins the next stage of his plan, using the Guardians as the entities' hosts. He also places Parallax back into the Central Power Battery, restoring the yellow impurity and brainwashing all the Green Lanterns into serving him. However, Hal, Giuy Gardner, John Stewart, Kyle Rayner, Guy Gardner, and Kilowog have a measure of resistance, due to their previous experience with fear. The other Lantern unaffected by the yellow impurity is Ganthet.

Kilowog is captured by Krona, and his resistance to brainwashing overcome. To prevent Krona from controlling them, the Earthmen take off their Green Lantern rings and put on the rings Hal rescued from the Book of the Black. Hal takes the Sinestro Corps ring, Guy takes the Red Lantern ring, John takes the Indigo Tribe ring, and Kyle takes the Blue Lantern ring. Hal, Guy, John and Kyle go to the Central Power Battery to remove Parallax and restore the Corps to normal. However, an ambush from the brainwashed Lanterns separates the group. Hal and Guy end up captured by the Guardians, while John and Kyle travel to Mogo with the intention of freeing it from Krona's control.

However, John and Kyle are attacked by Lanterns while they travel to Mogo's core. John harnesses the Black Lantern energy left in Mogo and uses it to destroy Mogo. This allows Hal and Guy to escape from Krona's forces and re-group with John and Kyle. The four Lanterns and Ganthet go to the Battery, where Hal wields the Agent Orange ring while Guy wields the Star Sapphire ring, much to Guy's dismay. Hal, John, Kyle and Ganthet fight the brainwashed Lanterns while Guy removes Parallax from the Battery with red and Star Sapphire rings, restoring the Corps.

With the impurity removed, Hal, Guy, John and Kyle recover their Green Lantern rings and join the Corps in the final battle against Krona and the entity-possessed Guardians.

During the final struggle, Hal and Kyle free Carol, Sinestro and the others from the Book of the Black. Also, Sinestro becomes a Green Lantern once again. Hal kills Krona, releasing the entities from the Guardians. However, the Guardians believe Hal to be the most dangerous Green Lantern as well as treason, so they discharge him from the Corps.

Rise of the Third Army 
The status of the Green Lantern Corps remained unchanged by the reboot applied in the Flashpoint series. As of 2011, Sinestro is still an unwilling Green Lantern, Hal remains exiled (although he has been forced to assist Sinestro's activities with a ring created and powered by Sinestro) while Kyle has gone AWOL alongside six members of the other Lantern Corps. John was recently forced to kill a Green Lantern named Kirrt Kallak, who was about to give in to torture the access codes to the Oan defense network from the Keepers. Guy remains the only main character with a stable position in the Corps.

The Guardians currently consider the Green Lantern Corps a failure. They are planning to replace it with a mysterious "Third Army", which will be led by the equally mysterious "First Lantern". The Third Army consists of beings with no free will that are made out of the Guardians' bio-tissue. The First Lantern is a being who was imprisoned and kept under guard by the older Guardians because he was deemed too dangerous to leave free.

Sinestro gave Hal Jordan a temporary ring to help him out on missions, but the Guardians attacked them and both rings merged into a single, faulty one. It mistakenly concluded that Sinestro and Jordan were dead, so it went in search of a new Lantern named Simon Baz. Simon Baz is a Muslim-American Green Lantern first shown in Green Lantern (vol. 5) #0.

The Guardians command the Third Army to destroy the Green Lanterns. B'dg of Sector 1014 says that some Green Lanterns have discovered the Guardians' true intentions.

Meanwhile, Green Lantern Sentinel Guy Gardner is assisting a ship as a peace treaty with warring planets. This is interrupted when he learns that his mortal enemy Xar is freed. Unbeknownst to Guy, Xar was freed by the Guardians. Guy takes half of the Lanterns with him away from the mission to keep his family safe, but they are met by members of the Third Army. The Third Army kills all of the Lanterns with Guy, including Lantern Vandor. Guy escapes, but only to be reprimanded and removed from the Corps, although he rejoined the Green Lantern Corps after finding out about the plot from the Guardians of the Universe.

Meanwhile, Green Lantern John Stewart is on a mission to gather all of the pieces of the deceased, sentient planet known as Mogo, in the hopes that Mogo can then restore himself. This succeeds, and Mogo is reborn. The Guardians had planned on assimilating the reformed Mogo into the Third Army. Mogo quickly defeated this division of the Third Army.

The rest of the Green Lantern Corps discovered that the Guardians had turned against them, so the Corps join the New Guardians and Atrocitus' Manhunters to help them fight. During the fight with the Third Army and the Guardians, the Guardians draw so much energy from Volthoom that he breaks free of containment. Volthoom says that everything the Guardians have created will be no more, and that the universe will be his once again.

Wrath of the First Lantern 
When Volthoom is freed, he teleports to the planet Maltus and imprisons the Guardians. While Volthoom is in a weakened state, he begins to drain the Lanterns and other present beings of their emotions, minds, and memories. He intends to examine their lives to restore his emotional powers. He alters their memories while doing so, apparently because he wants them to suffer. Among those that suffered these invasive processes: Guy Gardner, Kyle Rayner, John Stewart, Fatality, Carol Ferris, Larfleeze, Saint Walker, and Atrocitus.

Later, Volthoom destroys Sinestro's home planet of Korugar by draining the Korugarian's of their emotions. Sinestro survives the encounter and vows to kill Volthoom, as he became a member of the Sinestro Corps. Volthoom then returns to Oa to drain the rest of the green Lantern Corps, but Mogo shields them with dirt and stone so they may escape from Volthoom's powers. Mogo then rallies the Green Lantern Corps to fight against Volthoom.

The Green Lantern Corps and most of the other reserve Corps try to destroy Volthoom, but he easily manages to defeat the Corps. Then the Indigo Tribe appears. They open the Dead Zone portal from which hordes of undead, led by a Black Lantern Hal Jordan, emerge to attack Volthoom. Volthoom manages to destroy the army and drain Black Lantern Hal. Before Volthoom can unleash his full power, he is thwarted by Sinestro, who has become the new host of Parallax. Volthoom gains the upper hand, saying that he is more powerful than God. Then Black Lantern Hal proceeds to summon Nekron. He reduces Volthoom's emotional powers to a normal human state. Nekron slays Volthoom with his scythe for good, causing him to explode into rays of light.

After the battle is over, Hal is saved from the Black Lantern ring and becomes a Green Lantern again. He goes after Sinestro, who intends to kill the Guardians for everything they have done to him, to Korugar, and to the Universe at large. By the time Hal catches up, Sinestro reveals that Hal is too late. The Guardians are dead.

Later though, Sinestro meets in secret with ex-Guardians Ganthet and Sayd. He exiles them from Oa, but chooses to spare their lives since they had no involvement in Korugar's destruction.

Lights Out
As Hal accepts the offer to act as the leader of the Green Lantern Corps, all the corps started experiencing failure of their rings during a battle with Larfleeze. They then face an unexpected threat in the form of Relic, a resident of the universe that existed prior to this one, who seeks to destroy the various Corps in the belief that using the powers of the emotional spectrum drains an emotional 'reservoir' and hastens the death of the universe. Relic goes on to shatter the Blue Lantern power battery, new homeworld killing all Blue Lanterns except Saint Walker. Following this, Relic, wielding lantern draining technology, destroys Oa and the green lantern power battery. Relic is proved correct as it becomes clear that the universe is coming to an end due to lanterns using the power of the emotional spectrum, so he heads off to the Source Wall to save reality. To help fight Relic, Hal recruits now Red Lantern Guy Gardner. After joining with the Green Lanterns to fight Relic, Hal promises to give the Red Lanterns a sector for them to watch over. Unwittingly, this sector becomes Sector 2814, where Earth resides, giving guardianship of Earth to the Red Lantern Corps. With Relic trapped in the Source War it is Kyle Rayner with the entities (except Parallax) who is able to use his White Lantern status to replenish the emotional reservoir beyond the Source Wall.

Following this the Green Lanterns make a new home on Mogo with a new battery made by the Indigo Tribe. Although they survived some Green Lanterns and Saint Walker are unwilling to use their rings if they damage the universe.

Uprising
Following their battle with Relic, the Green Lantern reputation is already tarnished by the Guardians and the Third Army but is further damaged by Durlan shapeshifters. The Durlans had been posing as green lantern support staff waiting for a time to strike and they posed as Hal Jordan revealing to the universe their rings do damage to the universe. The Durlans led by The Ancients make a pact with the Khund led by General Khurtz using Relic ring draining weapons and Prixiam Nol-Anj of the Outer Braid Clanns to rise up against the Green Lanterns in their weakened state. They even try to recruit former green lantern prisoners such as Bolphunga, Hunger Dog, etc. to their cause but who also fight back. As the Green Lantern corps is low on numbers, they deputize the former criminals teaming them with green lanterns. They recruit former leader of the Corpse Durlan Green Lantern member Von Daggle to hunt down his own kind to prevent them doing further harm. After clearing Mogo of Durlan spies and those posing as green lanterns, the green lanterns are able to stop the uprising. However, following this retreat the Durlans reveal their true intentions their allies are simply pawns; they destroy the Khund fleet, and their betrayal turns the Outer Clanns into helping the green lanterns. The Durlans had captured Daxamite green lantern Sodam Yat discovering his Superman-like powers and their true goal was to turn themselves into Daxamites to conquer the universe. Having already replaced a large number of people from Daxam, the Durlans head off to claim the energy they need to permanently stay as Daxamites. They are stopped by the green lantern corps. However, one Durlan, who had been posing as John Stewart's love Fatality (hence how the Durlans were always one step ahead), successfully becomes a Daxanite by reaching the energy. She too is defeated by being moved away from a yellow sun. For their help the former green lantern prisoners are given clean records, while Von Daggle with help from Mogo strips his Durlan brethren of their shapeshifting powers so not be a threat to the corps again.

Godhead 
While breaching the Source Wall, it is revealed that Kyle acquired the Life Equation. After discovering this, Highfather, of the New Gods on New Genesis, believes it is the weapon he needs to defeat Darkseid. Also, the fact that mortals wielding of the emotional spectrum could have access to such power Highfather declares war on all the Corps across the universe. The New Gods quickly incapacitate all the corps forcing the Green Lanterns to ally with the Sinestro Corps even including The Weaponer to help save the Star Sapphires and Indigo Tribe. When the combined corps attempt to attack in force against the New Gods they are betrayed by the Indigo Tribe and imprisoned. Soon Kyle Rayner is tricked by Highfather into gaining the Life Equation intending to take the fight to Earth, then convert the planet and universe into an army to fight Darkseid. After receiving help from some New Gods especially Malhedron who disagree with Highfather, our heroes escape striking back against the New Gods waiting for reinforcements from Hal Jordan. Hal recruits Black Hand who creates an army of Black Lanterns from the titans held in the Source Wall and transported to New Genesis thanks to Sinestro. Unable to stop these Source Titans the New Gods are defeated but soon Black Hand loses control when the Sources Titans come back to life. Meanwhile, the Templar Guardians reveal that Kyle Rayner still has the Life Equations within him and takes the power off Highfather, teleporting away the Source Titans. Relic is also restored to life escaping and the Sinestro Corps retreats leaving the New Gods to their fate. With New Genesis falling from the sky Hal Jordan lands the island with help from restored Blue Lantern Saint Walker. Highfather realizing he is becoming like Darkseid ends the war with the Corps and apologies unable to change his actions. The Green Lantern Corps returns home to Mogo.

Shadow Empire
John Stewart is named second in command of the GLC as Corps Commander by the Templar Guardians, while Von Daggle with help from Hunger Dog finds his partner Asile working undercover posted there by the former Guardians to work for the Shadow Empire. They are led by a witch called Wyllt who as a child crashed on Ysmault where the demons poisoned her mind, although she was rescued by Abin Sur whose mind was also eventually poisoned by the same demons. She became consumed with restoring darkness to universe by expelling light. When a planet-destroying bomb on the planet Zarox is discovered by John Stewart the full scope of her plans are revealed. She had influenced the Durlans and Khund in their Uprising and was the one responsible for the bomb that destroyed Xanshi, the planet John Stewart had once accidentally destroyed. These world-destroying bombs are powered by negative emotions and protected against a Green Lantern's willpower energy. After rallying the people of Zarox positively, John Stewart uses his Star Sapphires ring he acquired during the New Gods War to save the planet and repel the Shadow Empire. However, Wyllt flees with it being revealed that the Shadow Empire is in every space sector and has negative emotion bombs buried on hundreds of worlds.

The Darkseid War
Darkseid comes into conflict with the Anti-Monitor thanks to Darkseid's amazon daughter Grail. It is revealed that the Anti-Monitor was once a scientist named Mobius, who found the anti-life equation at center of the anti-matter universe on Qward. Mobius believes that with the death of Darkseid, he will be free from being the Anti-Monitor. After an intense battle, the Anti-Monitor fuses the Black Racer with The Flash and sends it after Darkseid. Using the fused Flash and his own powers, he kills Darkseid. With Darkseid dead, the universe is unbalanced as it has lost its God of Evil. Darkseid's Mother Box searches for someone as powerful as he but locks onto the Central Power Battery of the Green Lantern Corps. It merges with the Central Power Battery and wielding Darkseid's parademon army to destroy the Green Lantern Corps. Hal Jordan battles the whole army and is captured and brought before the Mother Box. There it reveals it wants to serve a new god with Hal Jordan agreeing to be its god, he is then changed into the God of Light. Hal uses his godlike power to restore Oa and the Corps but realizes he should simply restore things to the way they were whether good or bad. He uses his power to destroy the Mother Box and undo the parademon attack. During the final battle against Grail and a reborn Darkseid, John Stewart and the Green Lantern Corps arrive to help save Earth and the universe.

Lost Army
Faced with the wider universe becoming increasingly troubled by the Green Lanterns' existence after the chaos of recent events, Hal Jordan decides to act as a scapegoat, going on the run with Krona's prototype gauntlet so that the rest of the Corps can denounce him as a renegade and redeem their own reputation. However, this plan doesn't last long as the majority of the Corps are transported to the universe before ours where Relic came from. They arrive during the War of the Dwindling Light and the universe about to end. There they encounter a time displaced Krona and a younger Relic as allies fighting against all Lightsmiths of that dying universe. Six months on and with days till the end of the universe they encounter a planet Perduron with the Last City housing refugees. They help Marniel who leads them to defeat the Blackest Knights Ausras and Dismas. The Last City is moved to Mogo and Perduron destroyed. What remains of the Corps enters a tear in space that they hope will return them home. It is unclear who/what transported them to the universe before.

Hal Jordan although a fugitive continues to help people, discovering the Corps gone, he tries to become a one-man corps with help from his ship's AI Darlene, plus ally Virgo and criminal Trapper. With worlds being turned into source wall rock, with help from Relic Hal discovers this is accidentally being done by Black Hand, who is defeated by being absorbed into the Source Wall. Hal also helps stop some Modoran terrorists on Earth and fights a version of himself as Parallax from another universe. With the Corps gone the Gray Agents attempt to take over but are also stopped by Hal who then parts ways with his new allies/friends. Soon Hal is channeling enough Will has become the living embodiment of it and plans to save the Corps.

The Sinestro Corps take over the Green Lantern's Corps role of 'protecting' the universe, by bringing order through fear. To do this, Sinestro creates an army of Manhunters, acquires War World from Mongul and bonds it with Ranx. Sinestro also hires Lobo to deal with the other lantern corps, killing many red/indigo lanterns including human red lantern Rankorr, plus kidnapping Saint Walker. The Sinestro Corps moment as replacement protectors comes against The Paling, anti-emotion religious monks called Pale Vicars who turn people into emotionless followers. With help from Black Adam, Sinestro discovers that they are led by the Pale Bishop a former Guardian of the Universe who turned his back on his kind when they started to use the Emotional Spectrum. Sinestro uses his all assets against The Paling including Saint Walker who can now supercharge Sinestro Corps rings and also giving out temporary yellow rings to many heroes/villains of Earth such as Superman and Wonder Woman. Sinestro fights the Pale Bishop directly and successfully kills the Guardian, but this leaves him severely weakened. The Sinestro Corps is praised for saving the Earth and the galaxy, even thanked by members of the Justice League. Sinestro gives leadership of this corps over to his daughter former Green Lantern Soranik Natu, who makes Arkillo partnered with Saint Walker lanterns assigned to Earth sector. A weakened Sinestro is happy that his corps is now what he always wanted the Green Lantern Corps to be. Soon after the Sinestro Corps successfully deals with many threats to the galaxy including the reborn Red Lanterns.

With no Corps Kyle Rayner tries to single-handedly bring peace to the Vega System then after being kidnapped he joins the Omega Men. He helps fight The Citadel as the 'Omega Lantern', after 182 days the Omega War is over with The Citadel defeated with Vega liberated.

Rebirth
Hal returns as Green Lantern again after abandoning the prototype gauntlet due to its energies starting to transform him into a living construct, although he uses his new powers to forge a new power ring from Will itself for himself. Hal now equipped with his self-constructed power ring is a one-man corps searching for the rest of the Green Lanterns and hunting down the Sinestro Corps.

Hal returns to Earth temporarily to assign Simon Baz and Jessica Cruz the task of protecting Earth, he takes their Power Batteries and fuses them into a single battery to help the two bond as Lantern partners.

The Green Lantern Corps returns in a distant part of the universe where Guy Gardner is sent out to scout their location. The fight to return to their own universe and time has cost the Lanterns over ninety percent of their fighting force in deaths and injuries. They are currently at 412 active Lanterns.

The Sinestro Corps has moved Warworld into the former place of Oa where a dying Sinestro is rejuvenated by bonding with Parallax and explains he used his daughter to gain the trust of the universe so now he could inflict great fear on the universe to establish order. He then creates a fear engine giving great power to himself and his corps maintained by Sacrament Priests.

Hal takes on several Yellow Lanterns and gets injured, but he is healed by Soranik, Sinestro's daughter. Soranik finds yellow lanterns loyal to her and saves the captives of the fear engine including Guy Gardner who was being tortured. Hal Jordan then confronts Sinestro where he uses his new living construct powers to seemingly kill himself, Sinestro, Lyssa Drak, Ranx and Warworld.

Ganthet and Sayd return to discover Hal's ring and summon Kyle Rayner the White Lantern to use his life powers to restore Hal to life. Hal meets Abin Sur in the Emerald Space where lanterns go when they die and tells him to save Hope, soon he is restored to life and reunited with the corps.

On Earth, Simon and Jessica battle the Red Lantern Corps, who create a Hell Tower on Earth infecting people with rage. During this, Simon develops a new power called Emerald Sight being able to see the future and also do the impossible again by briefly curing Bleez of rage. Although they destroy the Hell Tower believing they won, the Red Lanterns were able to plant a Rage Seed in the Earth's core to one day bring about Red Dawn the birth of a new Rage entity.

Alliance with the Sinestro Corps
Soon after the Green Lanterns join up with Soranik's loyal yellow lanterns to defend the planet Xudar from Starro only to be bottled by a Brainiac controlled by Larfleeze. After tricking Larfleeze they escape who then flees, save Xudar and announce going forward the two corps will try to work together.

Green Lanterns and Sinestro Corps members are partnered up so the two corps can reluctantly begin working together, their first joint mission is to round up any remaining Sinestro Corps members and give them a choice, join work with the Green Lanterns or be jailed. Thanks to information from Space Cabbie all senior members of the Sinestro Corps are captured, killed or jailed. Most prominently Arkillo joins after being horrifically beaten in a non-power ring hand-to-hand fight by Guy Gardner, bringing most in line.

Meanwhile, Hal and Kyle retrieve Saint Walker for the Ganthet and Sayd to save Hope. Kyle uses his White Lantern powers of Life in conjunction with Walker's Hope to try to resurrect the Blue Lantern Corps. Some sort of mysterious intruder blocks this attempt and causes Kyle's White Lantern ring to be torn asunder back into seven separate rings. Kyle only retains his original GL ring and is once again a Green Lantern in his classic costume.

The building of a new Sinestro Corps power battery on Mogo is interrupted by the arrival of Time Master Rip Hunter stating the Green Lantern Corps has ceased to exist in the future. A criminal from the future named Sarko an advocate of fear wants to prevent the successful future alliance between the Corps when the Sinestro Corps ultimately joins the Green Lantern Corps and yellow fear ceases to be. Sarko attacks with Corps with Prism Beasts impervious to harm as they were created by Krona's Gauntlet left by Hal Jordan. Hal and Rip confront Sarko and a now sentient gauntlet, where Hal recovers and breaks the present-day gauntlet, and its overload killing Sarko. However, Kyle using a future Green Lantern ring from Rip discovers that Sarko was his and Soranik's possible future son.

The alliance next thwarts Bolphunga and the Cepheid Raiders from stealing from planet Vault, Bolphunga then attempts blackmailing them claiming to have footage of a Green Lantern murdering a Sinestro Corps member. Although Guy Gardner and Arkillo recover the footage and defeat the raiders, it reveals that Tomar-Tu murdered the surrendering child killer Romat-Ru. Elsewhere Kyle is punishing for Soranik to become a Green Lantern again to avoid the future Sarko came from. Soranik decides to do an autopsy on Sarko to explain Kyle's interest in him, discovering it was her future son and his body fades away. She confronts Kyle for hiding this, that she cut up her own child, in rage she destroys her green lantern ring and brands Kyle with the mark of the Sinestro Corps. Hal attempts to help Tomar-Tu, but he accepts that he broke the law and must face punishment. To ensure the alliance can continue John Stewart decides to come clean about this rather than cover it up. Sinestro Corps members attempt to kill Tomar-Tu but are later calmed until Soranik arrives. Soranik declares the alliance over for lying to them and a lantern murdering one of hers, stating that she will embrace Fear, her father's legacy and no longer be Soranik Natu but Soranik Sinestro. John Stewart accepts any Sinestro Corps members loyal to the Green Lantern Corps who are quickly labelled traitors. As the Corps battle John Stewart activates a safety measure, he built into the new Sinestro Corps power battery, a green impunity making them ineffective against willpower as a result Soranik and her Corps leave. The Sinestro Corps power battery is dismantled, the loyal Sinestro Corps members are made Green Lanterns, while Tomar-Tu is taken away to be imprisoned but not before sending his ring to find a new Xudarian green lantern, hoping one day to redeem himself. As a result, Sarko had changed history keeping the two Corps apart, but not only that; on Qward is revealed that Lyssa Drak and a heavily injured Sinestro have survived.

Shortly thereafter the Green Lantern Corps help save High Father, Orion and the New Gods from Nth Metal Golems made by Yuga Khan of the Old Gods designed to kill his own progeny and free him from the Source Wall.

Phantom Lantern & Return of Volthoom
Simon and Jessica encounter Rami the rogue guardian, exiled by the guardians for creating the Phantom Ring, a ring created that can channel any light and can be used by any bearer. It is also revealed that Rami created the first Green Lantern rings to fight the First Lantern Volthoom.

Frank Laminski, a man obsessed with becoming a Green Lantern and who was almost chosen by Simon's ring, acquires the Phantom Ring becoming the Phantom Lantern thanks to help from a ghost-like remnant of Volthoom. The Phantom Ring shifts depending on which emotion the wearer is feeling most strongly, creating the risk of them becoming compromised by the ring's power. The ring does not have an external battery but relies on the wearer's own life-energy, creating the risk of being lethal to the wearer if they push themselves too far. Laminski almost kills Simon and Jessica when he confronts them after trying to act as a hero, his greed and anger causing him to tap into the Red and Orange rings, but when he is forced to face the damage, he has done, he reverts to an indigo ring long enough to remove the ring himself. Laminski is taken in custody vowing to get his Phantom Ring back. Meanwhile, Rami is captured by Volthoom who transfers himself into Rami's body unknown to Jessica and Simon.

Simon begins to help Jessica with her anxiety, helping with normal everyday life. While teaming with Batman, the pair help battle Scarecrow using a fear energy machine he had constructed when previously wearing Sinestro Corps rings. Batman also convinces Simon to give up his gun, and remarking this is the Green Lantern he has been waiting to work with for a very long time.

It is later revealed how Volthoom survived Nekron and his origin. Originally from Earth-15, he and his mother created the Travel Lantern powered by the emotional spectrum to travel in space, time and dimensions. Volthoom used it to travel the Multiverse to find a way to save his Earth from The Destroyer Pulsar. He traveled to Earth-3 where Mordru fused a piece of his soul to create a power ring - The Ring of the Volthoom, the same one recently wielded by Jessica. He discovered the future Guardians, who with his help built their first lantern, The Great Heart storing their emotional souls into it and declaring the first oath:

As a result, the First Ring was created, taken by Volthoom with the Great Heart implanted in his chest. When Rami and the Guardians turned on him, they destroyed the Travel Lantern preventing him from saving his home. As a result, The First Seven Green Lantern rings were made and later defeated Volthoom trapping him in the Chamber of Shadows. After the events of the Wraith of the First Lantern, Nekron reveals to Volthoom in the Dead Zone that he cannot kill him due to his permanent connection to the emotional spectrum and that as long as there is light in the universe he cannot die. With his return to life, he is drawn to Rami and the Phantom Ring to get his revenge.

After battling Doctor Polaris and saving Gateway City from a collision with the Justice League Watchtower, having learned about Rami, Corps Leader John Stewart summons Simon and Jessica to Mogo. Jessica completes her White Circle rookie training with Guy Gardner and Simon gets extra training from Kyle. Jessica and Simon then escort Rami (Volthoom) to the Vault of Shadows where the Guardians bury their secrets. Volthoom learns that his Travel Lantern was destroyed by Rami to forge the First Seven Green Lantern rings, he discovers that Jessica's ring is one of the first seven and intends to use it to travel home. In flashback, it is revealed that Rami went to Volthoom's home Earth and Volthoom's attempts to save it actually caused its destruction, to save that Earth Rami destroyed the Travel Lantern. While in the Vault, Volthoom retrieves the First Ring restoring himself fully and exiting Rami's body. He easily defeats Simon shattering his ring and tries to use Jessica's ring Travel Lantern programming, however at Jessica's urging, the ring transports Simon and Jessica away from the First Lantern.

The First Seven
Jessica and Simon find themselves transported to Earth 10 billion years ago during the time Volthoom went mad. Rami creates the first seven green lantern rings made from Volthoom's Travel Lantern, sending them out to find lanterns to help defeat the First Lantern. The seven chosen are: Kaja Dox of Yod Colu; Alitha of Galactica The Third World; Brill, AI of The Hive, of Grenda; Tyran'r of Tamaran; Calleen, Cosmic Plant Elemental of Alstair; Jan-Al of Krypton; and Z'kran Z'rann, White Martian of Vengeance, of Mars

Rami tells the new lanterns they are needed due to the crisis of the First Lantern Volthoom, however the first lanterns want to use the rings for their own gain. After Jan-Al is killed by an overload of willpower as these first rings have no limitations the lanterns accept training from Jessica and Simon. As Volthoom cannot get the Guardians out of the Citadel and, unaware they cannot give him back the Travel Lantern, he destroys a planet, making the new lanterns join the mission to stop the first lantern. Attacking Volthoom he kills four of the first seven lanterns, then as he prepares to kill the rest including Jessica, Simon attacks with no ring. Soon all the rings of the fallen lanterns go to Simon who traps Volthoom long enough for Jessica to remind Volthoom who he was. Repenting on his actions is interrupted by the Guardians who capture Volthoom and take away the First Ring. The First Seven rings are then taken back and to be locked up in the Vault of Shadows. Jessica and Simon now reveal they are from the future and tell Rami not to imprison Volthoom in the Chamber of Shadows. To repay their kindness Volthoom activates the Travel Lantern part of Jessica's ring sending them both back to the future. In the present Volthoom has restored Rami's soul saving him for unknown reasons. Tyran'r guardian of the Vault and last of the First Seven gives up his ring to Simon. Rami reveals that Tyran'r has protected the Vault for billions of years, the final resting place of the First Seven, the First Ring and First Seven Green Lantern rings, the Green Lantern rings only used again after the Manhunters to create the Corps. Now that Simon and Jessica have two of the seven first rings Volthoom is after, Rami and Tyran'r intend to find the remaining five before the First Lantern.

Twilight of the Guardians
Superman tracks down the Fear entity Parallax possessing children who then volunteers to become its host to save the children. Soon after Sinestro captures them and transports them to Qward. Parallax is now afraid of being controlled by Sinestro, who is saved by Superman. Sinestro and Lyssa Drak escape, and Superman is transported by the Weaponers back to Earth. Superman informs Hal of Sinestro's survival and hands over Parallax who has also fled. Superman and Hal next help Hector Hammond who is being kidnapped by the Kroloteans. Who reveal they made Hammond to be their God Brain, making him their weapon. Once saved Hammond kills the Kroloteans and attempts suicide by controlling Superman's heat vision but is saved by Hal.

During Metal Hal Jordan helps mount a defense against the Dark Multiverse's Dark Knights, specifically against the Dawnbreaker the twisted Batman Green Lantern. During this, he wore Element X armour made from the metal of possibility.

When Ganthet and Sayd are taken it is revealed to be what remains of The Controllers led by Kellic, where they have rounded up every Guardian left. Sharing their origin with the Guardians from Maltus being once the same race and with both groups now going extinct, The Controllers begin killing them one by one, soon Yekop, Natos and Gurion are remade into Controllers. Hal, Guy, John and Kyle search and ultimately find The Controllers, releasing the Guardians before suffering the same fate as their brothers. The Controllers, however, escape, revealing that although they are stronger in number now, they need an army and so set about creating new Darkstars. The last surviving Guardians: Ganthet, Sayd, Kada Dal, Rami, Zalla and Paalko decide to take up an active role to guide the Corps again and repair their reputation by creating a positive lasting legacy.

The new council of Guardians first involvement with Corps came with a conflict with General Zod and his family. When Hal and Kyle are captured and stripped of their rings by Zod on the planet Jekuul, where he is worshiped as a God and also equipping the natives with Sunstone Spears. Hal is able to summon his ring and gives it to Kyle to get help. The Guardians are reluctant to act, but an unauthorized rescue mission is still taken to save Hal. Kyle even with Hal's ring that makes him overpowered as it is made of pure willpower is not enough to stop Zod. Hal demonstrates a new power to 'teleport' to his ring and confront Zod. Hal captures Zod but the Guardians arrive and declare he should be released as they were the aggressors. The Green Lantern Corps although unhappy with this agree to leave. Kyle's ring is also returned but not before Zod and his allies have copied all data off it as part of a bigger strategy.

Simon and Jessica help save a race called the Molites transporting them to Abin Sur's homeworld of Ungara. Simon using his miracle healing powers to save the life of the Ungaran Regent's daughter. They also help a recently freed Bolphunga, freed by making a deal to kill his elderly father Boff, with a being called Singularity Jain. Bolphunga's rep is revealed as a work of fiction, when the Green Lanterns are fighting Jain, the battle ends as it is revealed Bolphunga has killed his father making good on the deal. Jain escapes and Bolphunga goes back to the prison but using his father death as the first step in making his rep a reality. When a Ungaran xenophobic group called Red Tide blames the murder on the Molites, Simon and Jessica help clear their names. In the defeat of Red Tide, the Regent's daughter attempts to use newly acquired superpowers to push the xenophobic movement's agenda into the public eye. This backfires with the public turning against her, with Simon taking back his healing sending her into a coma and with that the Regent of Ungara resigns having also done questionable things during war time.

Darkstars Rising
Kellic and The Controllers are about to launch their new Darkstar mantles, but some find themselves enslaved by their own technology. Their psionics are used to link the minds of Darkstars together and tapping into their cosmic energy to produce more mantles. The first Darkstar chosen is Tomar-Tu who becomes their leader. Soon more and more Darkstars are recruited murdering criminals across the universe with final justice. Tomar-Tu uses the chance to kill Goldface the man who murdered his father Tomar-Re. The Darkstars thanks to being linked together, in greater numbers and having advanced teleportation can easily defeat the Green Lantern Corps. This results in the four corpsman recruiting unlikely allies. Hal frees Hector Hammond, Guy gets Arkillo, Kyle with Space Cabbie recruit Orion of the New Gods and John convinces Zod who also provides KryptonIan tele-disrupters to stop the Darkstars teleporting. Guy also briefly becomes a Darkstar who almost kills his father Roland Gardner for abusing him, but is stopped by Arkillo. John Stewart comes up with a plan, where Hammnd severs the link between the Darkstars and The Controllers. Tomar-Tu fights Hal but is defeated, Hal uses his ability to be pure will overloading all the Darkstars mantles defeating them. With no loss of life, the green lanterns prove to the universe their justice is the best way. Tomar-Tu who is now remorseful of his actions is about to be killed by Zod as his father Tomar-Re failed Krypton. As Hal protects him Tomar-Tu takes his own life saying he was good at the end. The Controllers await trial but are in a coma and Hammond is missing after the fight. Back on Mogo, John Stewart announces that new rings have been created and sent out, finally these new recruits will replenish the many lanterns lost over many years of conflict.

Jessica and Simon meanwhile investigate a superhuman trafficking organisation called the Order of the Steed, venturing to Hellhole and teaming with Scrapps of the Omega Men. They also took part in a thousand-year-old ceremony regarding the lost lantern of the Vaikeans one of the first races to join the corps. Soon after Singular Jain returns trapping Jessica in the Green Realm, a place that holds onto previous Power Rings. With help from the Justice League and John Constantine Simon is able to help her break free of the realm and trapping Jain inside. It's also revealed that the reason why Jessica's ring talks is due to her will channelling her lost friends Matteo, Marc and Jeanette through it.

Evil's Might
A series of problems begin to affect the corps, John Stewart is attacked and left near death in a battle with an energy being called Eon who also leads an armada of 1200 ships crewed by The Ravagers. At the same time Mogo begins a series of devastating storms battering the corps headquarter. Also, a communication blackout jams the whole corps and conflicting orders supposedly given by the guardians create paranoia of a traitor. Soon a guardian Kada Sal is found murdered by Simon Baz and John Stewart is found then has surgery performed by Dr Thaava. Fighting the Ravagers over the planet Penelo Simon Baz abandons the corps in battle believing he is being ordered by the guardians to go to Earth. Simon believing, he is saving Superman actually releases Cyborg Superman Hank Henshaw. Henshaw reveals he has infiltrated the whole green lantern corps and central power battery, manipulating everything. Not only that Simon has unknowingly brought Henshaw the Phantom Ring, that Henshaw murdered the guardian for. Hal Jordan arrives turning the battle, but Penelo is lost then Henshaw's combined forces attack Mogo. With all his powers Henshaw defeats the guardians and causes all green lantern rings infected to stop working. Simon Baz gets John Stewart and the two attack and railing the corps. Henshaw abandons his troops so he can once again destroy Coast City, Hal goes after him. Eon is trapped the guardians and corps defeat a leaderless Ravagers. On Earth Hal battles Henshaw but Hal has brought reinforcements such as Sodam Yat, Medphyll and others. Before being seemingly defeated the Cyborg Superman along with Eon and the Phantom Ring disappear to parts unknown, with The Ravagers going to be settled on a new world. With Mogo needing time to heal, plans start to move to a New Oa. Also, it will take time for all lantern batteries to be cleansed of Henshaw's influence. After relocating the remaining population of Penelo, Jessica Cruz decides to leave Earth to explore the universe to find herself.

31st Century
In the future shown in the Legion of 3 Worlds miniseries, it is revealed that Mogo has been long dead. Without him, there is no way to distribute the rings; thus, there is no Green Lantern Corps in the 31st century. Rond Vidar was the last Green Lantern until he was killed by Superboy-Prime. Sodam Yat is the last Guardian of the Universe, living on the now ruined Oa. Previews for Legion of 3 Worlds #3 show Yat taking on several rings of the fallen Lanterns with a new oath:

After aiding the Legions in defeating Prime and his forces, Yat realizes the universe needs to fight such threats. Going back to Oa, he sends rings across the universe to recruit a new Green Lantern Corps.

A mysterious creature called the Dyogene is sent by Yat to recruit an Earth Green Lantern after incorrectly picking Kirt Niedrigh, also called Earth-Man, and failing to get Harmonia Li to join. Mon-El is chosen to become a Green Lantern. Later he gives up the ring because he is also field leader of the Legion of Super-Heroes.

In the original Legion continuity, the Green Lantern Corps were banned from Earth, thanks to the actions of the Green Lantern who became the Legion adversary, Universo. With recent alterations to this future continuity, it is unclear if this ban still exists. Similarly, the Guardians were revealed as still on Oa in the original continuity; their fate in the revised continuity has yet to be revealed.

Oath

The power ring must be recharged regularly (though apparently not at the standard 24-hour period as was originally described) by touching it to its lantern-shaped power battery for a period of several seconds. When recharging their rings, some Corps members recite an oath. This oath differs from Corps member to member, but the most popular seems to be Hal Jordan's.

Entity

As the embodiment of willpower which is connected to the green light of the Emotional Spectrum, Ion was revealed to be actually the emotional entity for the Green Lantern Corps. Representing the stability of willpower, Ion serves to support its host, providing a vast supply of power in return for the willpower it is provided by its host. Ethan Van Sciver describes Ion as resembling a large, primitive whale or fish. Born when life first moved of its own accord, the entity itself has several physical characteristics emulated by the Guardians and their Corps. Ion also has a monk fish-like appendage that ends in a lantern-like lure. Ion was later captured by Krona and joined the rogue Guardian on his quest to take control of the Green Lantern Corps, by possessing one of the remaining six Guardians of the Universe. Ion was eventually free from Krona's control when the rogue Guardian was killed by Hal Jordan and is once again at large in the universe.

Ion has since returned to the Green Central Power Battery, only leaving it when the battery itself forcefully removed the green entity from it because it was suffering from a strange illness. When Relic, a native of a prior version of spacetime, began a quest to prevent the harnessing the Emotional Electromagnetic Spectrum energy, he revealed that the Emotional Spectrum had a reservoir that was becoming exhausted, and it would eventually destroy the Universe. After Relic wiped out the Blue Lantern Corps and forcefully drained the green light from Oa's Central Power Battery and destroying the planet in the process, Ion sacrifices himself by passing into the Source Wall in order for the reservoir to be refilled.

Book of Oa

The Book of Oa is a massive tome, located on Oa. In it is the history of the Guardians of the Universe and the Green Lantern Corps. The current keeper of the book is Salaak.

Structure

The 3600 sectors

The Corps is an organization of 10000+ Green Lanterns (the old Corps was composed of 3600) who are chosen by the ring for being able to overcome great fear, with two assigned to each sector of space that require the protection of more than one Green Lantern (Earth, home to Hal Jordan and John Stewart, is in Sector 2814). Heavily populated Sectors like 2814 can have several Lanterns. While the primary Lanterns of Sector 2814 are Hal Jordan and John Stewart, Kyle Rayner and Guy Gardner call Earth home, but are stationed on Oa, first as teachers, and then specially assigned to cases that are too difficult for the average lantern. The official number of active Lanterns apparently does not include backup members who are kept in reserve to be called to active duty on short notice in the event that the regular Lantern in their particular sector is not available. In the original organization, the active list was apparently kept at a strict maximum considering John Stewart was not mobilized during the Nekron crisis despite the situation's dire nature, as opposed to Guy Gardner who was medically unfit for duty at that time. Despite the vast number of Green Lanterns, certain sectors of space apparently do not recognize the authority of the Corps, as alien superhero Icon claims that his status as a citizen of the interstellar civilization known as the Cooperative makes him immune to prosecution from Guardians or their agents.

Each member has a great deal of autonomy as to their methods in their jurisdiction, subject to review by the Guardians if they feel the Green Lantern in question has abused their assigned authority. The individual Lanterns are responsible for arranging their replacements (when possible) if they are near retirement or death. If a Lantern dies before that obligation is met, the ring will find and seek another trainee on its own. The planet-sized Green Lantern named Mogo plays a key role in this, helping to direct the rings to suitable recruits. For this reason, the Sinestro Corps tried to destroy Mogo during the Sinestro Corps War. In rare circumstances, Guardians will personally go out into the field to recruit a replacement, via telepresence. The recruitment of backup Lanterns is more ambiguous with different criteria such as the second closest worthy candidate to the dying Lantern in an emergency search is automatically designated, such as the case of Guy Gardner. When the sector's Lantern was still active, the Guardian would make a selection of a backup on their own, as with John Stewart's recruitment after Gardner was injured in an accident. Hal Jordan disagreed with this selection upon seeing Stewart's apparently belligerent attitude, but the Guardians stood by the decision and the recruit quickly proved himself.

Upon recruitment each Green Lantern in the original Corps received a Power Ring, a Power Battery shaped like a lantern (with which the ring is recharged), and a uniform. The default uniform design for humanoids was a green section covering the torso and shoulders, black arms and leggings, green boots, white gloves, green domino mask, and a chest symbol of a stylized Green Lantern icon on a white circle. Lanterns were allowed to customize their uniforms as long as the color scheme and the symbol were present. When the nature of the being precludes a standard uniform, an equivalent arrangement is expected as a substitute. For instance, Mogo, a sentient planet, arranges his foliage to create a green circling band and lantern symbol on his body. Jack T. Chance, a humanoid, refused to wear a uniform, but conceded to wearing a badge on the lapel of his coat. Lanterns were also allowed the option of a secret identity as a security measure and it is implied that the Corps were instructed to honor that choice by taking care not to expose them. Training in the use of the ring was optional and appropriate facilities and personnel were available on Oa upon request. In addition, a senior Lantern can be assigned to coach a recruit while in the field in their sector.

The New Green Lantern Corps being built by the Guardians is far more formal and structured than the old one that was destroyed by Parallax. Recruits, after being found by their Power Rings, are taken to Oa for training. Not all recruits will make it through training - indeed a great many of them might even fail, forcing the ring to find another candidate. Lantern trainees have a simplified version of the old Green Lantern uniform (with green covering more of the torso) with the white circle on their chest blank until the Lantern insignia is added upon completion of their training. Additionally, all Power Rings, not just the ring assigned to the interim Green Lantern Kyle Rayner, now work on the color yellow, provided the user can feel the fear behind the color and overcome it.

Salakk was selected as senior administrator and the Keeper of the Book of Oa. Due to this he was also selected as the Clarissi which means he is second in command after the Guardians of Oa.

Kilowog and Stel act as head drill sergeant of the Green Lantern Corps. Voz is the jailer and Morro is keeper of the crypt.

Oa: Corps headquarters

Green Lantern Corps headquarters are on the planet Oa, in the center of the universe. Oa was destroyed shortly after Hal Jordan became Parallax, but was later reconstituted by Jordan's friend Thomas Kalmaku. Formerly a natural if barren planet, the reconstructed Oa is now a vast labyrinthine planet-sized construct. Primary features include a great hall for the Guardians to meet in conference, training facilities for recruits, prisons called Sciencells for dangerous criminals, and tombs dedicated to honoring fallen lanterns. Oa's most prominent feature is the Central Power Battery, a gigantic version of the Lanterns' personal power batteries. The central battery channels the same green energy of the Guardians and amplifies it, broadcasting energy to the individual power batteries across the universe which can then be used to charge the Lanterns' power rings. Particularly dangerous beings, such as Sinestro or Parallax, are sometimes imprisoned within the central battery. Maintaining security on this device is vital as major damage to it would prevent individual Corpsmen throughout the universe from recharging their power rings, thus depowering the entire Corps in a single blow.

The Guardians increased the capabilities of Oa's defensive systems by creating an armored structure that protects the planet, but this was destroyed during the preludes to the Blackest Night storyline.

After the final battle with the First Lantern, the Guardians guarding Volthroom have taken up the position of Guardians of the Universe under the new name "Templar Guardians" and rule with love and compassion. The last two Guardians of the Universe Ganthet and Sayd, however, were exiled by from Oa by Sinestro who was possessed by Parallax.

Green Lantern Honor Guard
The Green Lantern Honor Guard is an elite group of Green Lanterns, based on Oa but not restricted to one sector, who serve as leaders of the Corps, troubleshooters and special operatives.

The title and mantle of Honor Guard was first introduced in issue #1 of the three-part miniseries Tales of the Green Lantern Corps. Amongst their rank were three elite Corps members; Tomar-Re, K'ryssma and Apros who lead three division of the Corps against the armies of the undead. In issue #3 the Guardians promote Green Lantern Hal Jordan as the first human to receive the honor for his heroic actions in leading the Corps in the defeat of Krona and Nekron.

Jordan, although flattered, declines the honor, maintaining that he should be seen as "no different than any other ring-slinger" who did "what any Green Lantern would have done given the chance!" Adding that "When it comes right down to it, I guess I'm just one of the gang" and so he remains, to the cheers of his fellow Corps mates.

Green Lantern Guy Gardner was promoted to primary membership in the Honor Guard as Lantern number one during the Green Lantern Corps: Recharge miniseries. Guy also serves as field commander during battle. In the aftermath of the Sinestro Corps War, with the Ion entity removed from his body, Kyle Rayner has been added to the Green Lantern Honor Guard as Guy's partner. In the Green Lantern Corps issue #48, John Stewart was introduced as Kyle Rayner's new partner in the Honor Guard, with Guy Gardner leaving to a new comic book called Emerald Warriors.

John Stewart, Soranik Natu, Ganthet, Hannu, Boodikka were promoted to Green Lantern Honor Guard after they freed the Grendians and Alpha Lanterns from Cyborg Superman.

During the Rise of the Third Army the highest rank a Green Lantern can achieve was awarded to Guy Gardner, the rank of Sentinel. A Sentinel outranks the Honor Guard and Salakk as senior administrator, only getting orders directly from the Guardians. However, this role was only temporary, as the Guardians mainly inducted him into this role to make his subsequent fall all the more significant, releasing an old enemy of Guy's while he was acting as a bodyguard so that his attention would be divided.

The Corpse

"The Corpse" is an elite, top-secret Black Ops division of the Green Lantern Corps. Members of The Corpse are not restricted by the same rules that regular Lanterns follow, and they perform the darkest, most dangerous missions and are allowed to use lethal force. These members do not use Power Rings; instead, they swallow special coin-like disks that give them all of the powers of the standard ring with a charge that lasts five earth days. These disks produce purple energy instead of the traditional green. Members of the "Corpse" do not wear Green Lantern uniforms, or display the Green Lantern symbol. Instead, they seem to prefer black uniforms that have no symbol.

Very few Lanterns are even aware of the existence of the "Corpse". Guy Gardner said that in all of his years in the Corps, he never heard of them and after participating in a mission with the Corpse, his memory of them was erased. With the recent authorization of lethal force for the Corps in the aftermath of the Sinestro Corps War, the future and necessity of the Corpse remains unknown.

Von Daggle, the only Durlan to serve in the Green Lantern Corps, was the former leader of The Corpse, after the rise of the Third Army and death of the Guardians, Von Daggle appears to be the last member. On the run and hiding from his own people Von Daggle is once more recruited to serve the Green Lantern Corps to help defeat the Durlan Uprising.

Whether part of The Corpse or a separate part of the corps, there were also Deep Undercover Green Lantern Operatives observing areas that technically Green Lanterns were not allowed to go. Jediah Caul was one such agent who worked in Lady Styx's Tenebrian Dominion.

The Alpha Lanterns

After the Sinestro Corps War, the Guardians create a new class of Green Lantern called the Alpha Lanterns. The Alpha Lanterns are seasoned Corpsmen who have been fused with their Power Rings and Batteries. Boodikka, Varix, Kraken, Green Man, and Chaselon are all confirmed Alpha Lanterns; John Stewart was offered the chance to become an Alpha Lantern, but turned it down because he felt that he knew too little about the concept of the Alpha Lanterns to accept the offer. Geoff Johns stated in an interview with IGN that the Alpha Lanterns function as Internal Affairs for the Green Lantern Corps. The concept of the Alpha Lantern Corps was conceived by Grant Morrison.

Following the events of the Blackest Night, it is revealed that some, if not all of the Alpha Lanterns have been recruited against their will. The Alpha Lanterns have been subverted by the Cyborg Superman and have turned many Lanterns into Alphas against their will. This is a bid to capture Ganthet, who knows much about their internal systems. The Cyborg, who is mostly Alpha himself, hopes that if Ganthet discovers how to turn the Alphas back to normal, the Cyborg can become human and thus die himself. After Henshaw is defeated, the Alpha Lanterns are restored with insights, values, and priorities and given a semblance of their free will, thanks to Ganthet.

When Krona along with the emotional entities launched his attack on Oa, attacking the six of the remaining Guardians (Ganthet working in the Anti-Matter universe at the time), by having them possessed by all the entities except for Parallax, who is placed inside the Central Power Battery. With the yellow impurity returned to the green light, all of the Green Lanterns - with the apparent exception of Hal Jordan, Kyle Rayner, John Stewart, Kilowog and Guy Gardner - are placed under Krona's control; the Alpha Lanterns are affected by the yellow impurity in such a way as to cause them to enter into some kind of hibernation.

After Krona's death, the Guardians went into deliberation on the future of the Corps when Sinestro was chosen by a Green Lantern Power Ring. Following acts of insubordination amongst the Green Lanterns, the Guardians ordered all Corps members to return to their assigned sectors and missions. Only the Honor Guard, Alpha Lanterns and support staff were allowed to remain on Oa at this time.

When John Stewart was forced to kill fellow Lantern Kirrt after he was broken by the Keepers' interrogation and was about to give them the information on Oa's planetary shield codes, his death was later registered as a Code GLD that led to the Alpha Lanterns congregating at the Chambers of The Alpha Lanterns where they agreed to commence the arraignment despite their actions causing a possible uproar in the Corps. They later struck at Warriors Bar to place John Stewart under arrest The Alpha Lanterns took him for a court appearance before the collective Corps and The Guardians of the Universe to contemplate the evidence against him. Ultimately, it was concluded that Stewart was guilty, and the Alpha Lanterns decided on the judgement of death for his crime. They believed this decision would prevent any future Green Lantern from conducting a similar act. The decision of the Alpha Lanterns was met with opposition from the Green Lantern Corps. As a result, the cybernetic Lanterns decided to not imprison Stewart in a normal detention cell but leave him confined in the Alpha Tower until his time of execution.

Afterwards, they met with the Guardians of The Universe and newly promoted Sentinel Guy Gardner. The Oans whilst not happy with the decision ultimately decided to agree with the Alpha Lanterns decision. Upon believing the Guardians approval, the Alpha Lanterns wanted the Oans to collectively execute Stewart. This approach was refused, and the Alpha Lanterns offered an alternative of bringing in an off-world executioner. However, this approach was also refused in an angry outburst by Gardner who left but not before telling the Alpha Lantern Corps to execute Stewart themselves if they had sentenced him to that fate. The Guardians did not condone Gardner's behavior but believed his words rang true and told the Alpha Lanterns to conduct the sentence. Following that point, Gardner went to the Alpha Tower where he was escorted by Boodikka to provide a final meal to Lantern Stewart. Whilst being monitored, the Alpha Lanterns did not anticipate a breakout attempt by the rest of the Green Lantern Corps where Stewart was taken. Whilst battling Green Lanterns, the Alpha Lanterns tapped into the Central Power Battery and forcibly removed the charge from their opponents Power Rings.

Following that point, the Alpha Lanterns pressed their advantage, but the two renegade Earth Lanterns unleashed reprogrammed Manhunters against them. In addition, the Alpha Lanterns faced a renewed assault from the rest of the Green Lantern Corps who had been freed from the Sciencells. The cyborg Alpha Lanterns ended up fighting a renewed assault from both sides and saw them unite to defeat an amalgam composite of a massive Manhunter. Once destroyed, they continued their attack against Stewart and Gardner where they successfully managed to capture them. With the rogue Manhunters defeated, the cybernetic Alpha Lanterns proceeded to drain the Power Rings of the Green Lantern Corps of their charge where they intended to punish all the Lanterns for their dissent. With the Earth Lanterns captive, the Alpha Lanterns proceeded with their judgement only for Varix to turn against his cybernetic brethren. He freed Stewart and Gardner whereupon the pair dismantled the Alpha Lantern Corps and killed them. This left Varix the only Alpha Lantern left and he terminated himself as he believed he along with his comrades had disgraced the Green Lantern Corps. Afterwards, the bodies of Varix and the Alpha Lanterns were interred in the Crypt of the Green Lantern Corps but were shown prior to their transformation into cyborgs.

While the Alpha Lanterns were a subdivision of the Green Lantern Corps, they had an oath of their own:

The Keepers

The Keepers was the name given to a race of humanoid beings that inhabited the planet Urak. These skeletal beings native world was a barren world where their race struggled to exist. Their existence changed when their homeworld was visited by the Guardians of the Universe who were seeking a place that would serve as a storage ground for the Green Lantern Power Batteries. This came after it became apparent that members of the Green Lantern Corps began to suffer when their Power Rings ran out of charge. Thus, the Oans sought out a means of addressing this issue by providing easy access between a Green Lantern and their Power Rings. They learnt that the unique properties of Urak allowed for a temporal conduit between a Power Battery and Power Ring whereupon they made a pact with the native species. In exchange for rebuilding their world, the race would act as protectors and custodians of the Power Batteries that were stored in the Emerald Plains. Thus, the native inhabitants of Urak became known as the Keepers due to their new role. The unique composition of their homeworld led to the Power Batteries growing as if they were crops within the Emerald Fields. Though they held an important role in the Green Lantern Corps, their existence was not known to the Green Lanterns with even their Power Rings unable to identify the species. These conditions, however, led to a form of symbiosis as the Power Batteries provided energy that nourished Urak and fed its people. The energy of Willpower was thus infused into the singular DNA of the Keepers and provided them an amazingly potent force of will. As a result, they became beings that possessed an innate reserve of willpower which was overwhelming and not in proportion with their relatively common forms. This trait made their armor completely immune to the effects of Lantern Energy Construct that derived from Willpower in the Emotional Spectrum. Their strength of will made them capable of actually willing their own bodies to shut down and kill themselves. The lush homeworld allowed their race to prosper as shepherds in this role. Events changed for the race in 2012 when the Oans arrived on Urak and removed all the Power Batteries from the Keepers care who they referred to as undeserving parasites. This act led to Urak returning to its formerly barren existence with the Keepers struggling to simply survive, so they begin to attack another planets to steal their resources.

First Lantern
The First Lantern is a mysterious being that stirs within imprisonment, sealed in the Chamber of Shadows for billions of years by the Guardians of the Universe. The Guardians (who have become unemotional) decided the Green Lantern Corps had failed as an interstellar police force due to their emotions and free will and it was time to replace them, so they traveled to the Chamber of Shadows to pull the First Lantern out; however, as they reach the Chamber of Shadows they had to battle another group of Oans that were tasked with guarding the enigmatic First Lantern, even from the Guardians themselves. Despite heavy resistance, the Guardians take the First Lantern, who is able to recognize the Guardians and demands to be let out to no avail, and travel to Earth where they use the DNA of the First Lantern along with their own flesh to create a horde of infectious warriors, known as the Third Army. The imprisoned First Lantern tells them that they will regret what they have done and that he will escape. As the Third Army spread over the universe destroying all life and free will, the Guardians told the First Lantern that once the Third Army completes their control over the whole universe, there will be no need for him. Meanwhile, Black Hand reanimated the elder Oan (who was killed by the Guardians) for information about where the Guardians hid the First Lantern, but is only told that the First Lantern endangers the universe. When the Guardians realize they cannot completely control the universe and need more of the Third Army, they use more of the power of the First Lantern, without realizing that the First Lantern's prison is breaking. While Hal Jordan and Sinestro are trapped in the Dead Zone, they encounter Tomar-Re (who was undead in the Dead Zone) and tells them to stop the First Lantern, before he goes about bringing changes to reality in history. It is eventually explained that the First Lantern was a mysterious explorer named Volthoom from an unknown time and universe, who had reached this universe during the beginning of Krona's experiment to observe of the origins of the universe. Volthoom had apparently unlocked the power of the Emotional spectrum as he came with a power battery of his own (later revealed to be the "Travel Lantern") and taught what he knew about the Emotional Electromagnetic Spectrum energy to the Guardians of the Universe. As they scrambled to copy his gifts using technology, the Maltusians forsook their emotions, casting them into a device of their own creation, "The Great Heart". As a result of the influx of power and energy a ring was created, the very first Power Ring which they would use in conjunction with Volthoom's own power battery to allow him to return to his home. However, because the power battery was a direct connection to the emotional spectrum and had no intermediary battery, no safety regulators and no modulators, Volthoom became corrupted by its powers and took them for himself. Now able to harness any color of the emotional spectrum, Volthoom dismayed the Guardians of the Universe and renaming himself as the First Lantern, he began killing millions of beings in the universe. To fight back, the Guardians created the Manhunters and also released simultaneously the first seven Green Lantern rings to scan for possible users. Volthoom was eventually stripped from his power, sealed in an unbreakable chamber, and written out of their history. A number of Guardians remained behind to ensure that the First Lantern was kept imprisoned forever and became known as The Hidden Ones.

Eventually, the Guardians of the Universe inadvertently released a vengeful First Lantern from his prison. Approaching the combatants on Oa, he captured the Guardians, forcing Ganthet to relive all of his life's mistakes and the reasons behind them. He was unable to affect reality, however, as his power had been weakened by the Oans tapping into it. Thus, he reabsorbed his power from the Third Army, causing it to crumble to dust; deciding he needed reservoirs of emotional energy from sentient beings, he began to tap into the memories of his captured foes and torture them emotionally. Among his victims were Guy Gardner, Kyle Rayner, John Stewart, Carol Ferris, Hal Jordan and Atrocitus. In addition, he fed on great sources of Emotional energy, gaining it via destroying Korugar and later by claiming the Great Heart on Maltus. With his powers at their height, Volthoom then reclaims the First Ring that Ganthet had kept within himself, intending to use the Central Power Battery as a conduit to alter the fabric of reality and conquer all of creation. However, he faced the combined might of all the warriors from the Emotional Spectrum. These included the vengeful Sinestro, who was angry over the destruction of his homeworld and bonded with the Parallax Entity. In addition, the recently deceased Hal Jordan returned as a Black Lantern and awoke Nekron from his prison in the Dead Zone. He utilized The Lord of The Dead to weaken Volthoom by separating him of his connection to the Emotional Spectrum, which, after Nekron sliced him in half, ultimately led to his defeat.

Yet while his body was destroyed, Volthoom's psychic energy still lives on, guiding Frank Laminski to use the Phantom Ring, which allows the user to harness any color of the Emotional Spectrum.

Volthoom also captured his erstwhile friend Rami,
an exiled Guardian of the Universe who forged the Phantom Ring and first seven Green Lantern rings; after a tremendous battle, trapping his essence in an energy sphere, Volthoom possessed Rami's body. Now under the guise of Rami, he plans on training Jessica Cruz and Simon Baz for his own agenda.

More recently we discovered that after Nekron slew him, Volthoom went to the Dead Zone, where he revealed his history to his killer.: Hailing from Earth 15, by the year 3079 his world was about to be destroyed (a result of Superboy Prime's attack during Countdown to Final Crisis). As a result of the impending doom surrounding his planet and his way of life, Volthoom and his mother, both scientists, had already discovered the Emotional Electromagnetic Spectrum. Together they invented the "Travel Lantern", an "experimental device for infinite exploration" that used the energies of the Emotional Spectrum to travel between various alternate Earths. Seeking a way to save their planet, Volthoom used the Travel Lantern to jump from universe to universe, including a stop in Earth-3 where the wizard Mordru used a piece of Volthoom's soul to create Power Ring's ring. Eventually Volthoom arrived in Earth 0 10 billion years in the past. After recounting his history to Nekron, Volthoom begs him to end his life; Necron reveals he cannot. Volthoom's bond with the Emotional Spectrum is profound and permanent, and as long as there is light in the universe, he will never die. As Necron utters this, Volthoom is immediately pulled back to Earth 0.

In the present day, Volthoom (as Rami), Simon Baz and Jessica Cruz are eventually called to Oa by the Green Lantern Corps; while there, Volthoom manages to make Ganthet and Sayd believe he is the real Rami. In this way, he is able to read several pages from the Book of Oa, discovering that while his Travel Lantern was destroyed, the device was used to build the first seven Green Lantern Rings; knowing this, he seeks the rings, presumably so he may use their power to return to his own world, and discovers they reside in the Vault of Shadows, guarded by the Mighty Tyran'r, sole surviving member of the first seven Lanterns. While Tyran'r uncovers Volthoom's ruse, Volthoom manages to prevent his revealing the truth to Simon and Jessica.
It's also revealed that 10 billion years ago, in an attempt to help Volthoom, Rami secretly used the Travel Lantern to reach Earth-15, seeing its destruction with his own eyes, only to discover that a time-traveling Volthoom, having gone mad, destroyed the very planet he had come back to save. To spare Earth 15, Rami tried to keep the Travel Lantern and First Ring away from him. Volthoom, enraged and corrupted by the powers of the entire Emotional Spectrum, attempted to force Rami to hand the items over, only for the other Guardians of the Universe to come to his aid. However, Volthoom killed many Guardians in his quest to find his travel lantern and ring. With no other choice, Rami destroyed the Travel Lantern, using it to forge the first seven Green Lantern Rings to harness the green Emotional Energy of willpower. Inside the Vault of Shadows, Volthoom manages to locate the First Ring; by donning it he sheds Rami and reveals himself to Jessica and Simon. (It's not quite clear what state Rami is in at this point.) He's been de-aged and restored by the First Ring and goes after Jessica Cruz. Simon is able to lock him in a prison, but Volthoom is able to escape it while Jessica Cruz tends to Rami. Volthoom overpowers Simon Baz's ring and destroys it. As Jessica was once the Power Ring of Earth-3, her Green Lantern ring is either fused with or made from Volthoom's Travel Ring. Volthoom tries to reclaim Jessica's ring, even accessing its protocols, but Jessica's will is strong and she escapes with Simon to San unknown location in the universe. It was later revealed that both Green Lanterns were flung ten billion years in the past.

Third Army
The Guardians of the Universe (who have become unemotional) were preparing to create the 'Third Army' to replace the Green Lantern Corps. The Guardians take the First Lantern away with them and teleport to Earth, where they used the power of the First Lantern to create the Third Army from their own flesh and will. The organic constructs have the ability to transform other beings into copies of themselves through direct contact.

It has been shown that they possess both enhanced strength and a collective intelligence which is shown during an attack on the Red Lanterns when Atrocitus stabs one of the Third Army in the eyes, where all the Third Army felt the pain. Some of the Third Army are destroyed by incineration with an explosive of a bomb. When the Third Army is sent to invade Zamaron, the Third Army is destroyed by White Lantern Kyle Rayner, who has mastered the seven powers of the emotional spectrum. When the First Lantern is freed from his imprisonment, he disintegrated all of the Third Army.

The First Seven
The First Seven are the predecessors of the Green Lantern Corps, assembled 10 billion years ago to bring Volthoom to justice.

Other versions

The Lightsmiths
In the universe prior to the current one, groups managed to tap into the wellspring of power created by the Emotional Spectrum. In this universe those who tapped into the green light were known as the Lightsmiths of the Green Light of Resolve.

Earth One
In the parallel universe of Earth-1, the Green Lantern Corps was wiped out centuries ago by the Manhunters, the Central Power Battery was presumed destroyed and the few remaining Power Rings were scattered across the galaxy and deprived of their full power. In the near future, the Corps is reborn when asteroid miner Hal Jordan discovers a Power Ring and, eventually, the Central Power Battery, which had been contained but not destroyed. Jordan is able to send out a distress call to all remaining power rings, and the ring bearers unite to retrieve the battery and destroy the majority of the Manhunters. With the full power of the rings restored, the Green Lantern Corps is reborn under the leadership of Arisia, with each member returning to their homeworld to defend it from the Manhunters, but also swearing to aid each other if needed.

Injustice: Gods Among Us
In the comic book prequel to Injustice: Gods Among Us, the Green Lantern Corps become the primary focus in Year Two. The Guardians, having heard of Superman's change and more forceful approach to enforce justice, send a squad of Green Lanterns to apprehend Superman and to bring him to Oa for trial. Superman, having been warned prematurely by Sinestro, as well as receiving aid from the Sinestro Corps, overpowers the squad, and forces them to relinquish their rings. This eventually forces a violent reaction from Ganthet, who proceeds to bring in a large amount of Green Lanterns as well as Mogo with him. Despite early advantages thanks to their numbers as well as the number of rioters within Earth, the Green Lanterns soon become overextended and are picked out individually because Superman's Regime brought civilians out to the front, knowing that the Green Lanterns would not attempt to harm them. Meanwhile, Superman, who was shot with a Kryptonite bullet by Black Canary, receives a Yellow Power ring, which he uses to extract the bullet, and he proceeds to kill Canary. With his powers further augmented, Superman proceeds to drive Ganthet and Mogo to the Earth's sun to end the war, and effectively wiping out nearly every Green Lantern that was involved in the war.

In other media

Television

 The Green Lantern Corps made an appearance in the Duck Dodgers episode "The Green Loontern". Besides Hal Jordan, the featured Green Lantern Corps members are Amanita, Arisia, Boodikka, Breeon, Brokk, Ch'p, Chaselon, Galius Zed, Green Lambkin, Guy Gardner, G'nort, Hannu, John Stewart, Katma Tui, Kilowog, K'ryssma, Larvox, M'Dahna, Medphyll, NautKeLoi, Penelops, Salakk, Stel, Tomar-Re, and Xax. After Duck Dodgers accidentally takes Hal Jordan's uniform from the dry cleaners due to a mix-up, he is teleported to the Corps location by the power ring, where they are in a fight with Sinestro's robots. During the fight, Sinestro kidnaps the entire Green Lantern Corps to act as a power source for a doomsday device. Duck Dodgers manages to save them (more through accident than skill) before giving the uniform back to Hal Jordan and being stranded in Sinestro's hideout as Hal Jordan and the rest of the Corps take their leave.

 The Green Lantern Corps appear in series set in the DC animated universe:
 Several Green Lantern Corps members also make cameos in the Superman: The Animated Series episode "In Brightest Day...", which featured Kyle Rayner.
 The Green Lantern Corps appear in the Justice League episodes "In Blackest Night" and "Hearts and Minds".
 The Green Lantern Corps appear in the Justice League Unlimited episode "The Return". After Amazo seemingly destroys Oa while on his mission to confront Lex Luthor, the Green Lantern Corps arrive on Earth while pursuing Amazo where they help rescue John Stewart and the defeated Justice League members that were in space. When they confront Amazo after Lex Luthor and Atom reasoned with them, Amazo stated that he actually moved Oa to another dimension as he returns Oa back to its original position.
 The Green Lantern Corps appear in Batman: The Brave and the Bold. In the teaser of "Day of the Dark Knight!", the Corps is having lunch in the cafeteria, and force Guy Gardner to clean up his mess. In "The Eyes of Despero!", they fight against Despero, and Hal Jordan hides them in his ring for protection.
 The Green Lantern Corps is the primary focus of Green Lantern: The Animated Series, with Hal Jordan and Kilowog as the main cast. Also in the show are "frontier space" members of the corps.
 Within the Arrowverse, during the Crisis on Infinite Earths crossover event, footage from the Green Lantern film was used to establish the existence of the Green Lantern Corps within the universe of Earth-12.
 The series finale of Arrow titled "Fadeout" ends with main character John Diggle / Spartan approaching what appears to be a Green Lantern ring that has fallen from the sky; suggesting that he will become a Green Lantern. In the eighth season of The Flash Diggle makes the choice to relinquish the Green Lantern ring to be with his family.

Film
 The Green Lantern Corps feature prominently in the Warner Brothers animated film Green Lantern: First Flight. The film follows the origins of Hal Jordan and Sinestro.
 The Green Lantern Corps is the focus of a following film, Green Lantern: Emerald Knights, which features several stories about various non-Terran Green Lanterns.
 The Green Lantern Corps appear in the Green Lantern live-action film. The leader of the Corps is Sinestro, with Abin Sur, Kilowog, and Tomar-Re being central characters.
 In Justice League vs. the Fatal Five, Jessica Cruz, Kilowog, and Salaak appear as representatives of the Corps. Holographic depictions of most of the Lantern Corps' human members - Hal Jordan, Guy Gardner, Kyle Rayner, John Stewart, and Cruz - also appear as part of a Justice League exhibit in the Legion of Super-Heroes Museum.
 The Green Lantern Corps appear in the films set in the DC Extended Universe:
 A character named Carrie Farris appears in the live-action films Man of Steel and Batman v Superman: Dawn of Justice, played by Christina Wren. She is a United States Air Force officer attached to the operations of United States Northern Command and the assistant to General Swanwick. Carrie Farris is a nod and allusion to Carol Ferris.
 Green Lantern Yalan Gur appears in a flashback in the Justice League film. He is seen fighting against Steppenwolf and his army of Parademons, but is overpowered and killed by Steppenwolf as his power ring flies off. Early in production, a deleted scene which was filmed as another post-credits scene depicting Kilowog and Tomar-Re visiting Bruce Wayne / Batman would have further teased Green Lantern Corps; but the scene was scrapped.
 In the Snyder cut of the film, Yalan Gur took part in the battle against Darkseid's forces. Darkseid behanded Yalan Gur before killing him as his power ring flies off.
 Warner Bros announced a Green Lantern Corps film for 2020, which is currently shelved.
 The Red Son incarnation of the Green Lantern Corps appears in Superman: Red Son.
 The Green Lantern Corps (Hal Jordan, John Stewart, Arisia Rrab, Arkkis Chummuck, Chaselon, Galius Zed, Green Man, Guy Gardner, Kilowog, Palaqua, and Salaak) appear in Justice League Dark: Apokolips War. Jordan is among the heroes decimated by Paradooms (hybrids of the Parademons and Doomsday), while other Lanterns and the Guardians are slaughtered by Darkseid himself on Oa.
 The Green Lantern Corps appear in Green Lantern: Beware My Power. Before the film's main events, the Green Lantern Corps are revealed to have been slaughtered by Sinestro and a Parallax-possessed Hal Jordan (the latter had also taken the fallen Lanterns' rings to achieve his full potential). After the Sinestro Corps are defeated, Jordan's successor John Stewart eventually takes Jordan's rings, and sends them to their new owners to rebuild the Corps.

Video games
 The Green Lantern Corps are featured heavily in the video game Mortal Kombat vs. DC Universe. Hal Jordan appears as a playable character and one of the game's major protagonists; the Guardians appear in the game's Oa based stage, and the rest of the Corps members are mentioned to be trying to contain the universe wide crisis taking place during Story Mode. Additionally, Sonya Blade's in-game ending depicts her becoming the Green Lantern of the Mortal Kombat universe after gaining the ring of a recently deceased Corps member.
 In Injustice: Gods Among Us, Kilowog is seen fighting Atrocitus in a Background. The Corps also appear in Green Lantern's victory pose. At the end of the game, the main universe's Hal Jordan brings the parallel universe's version of himself, who had joined the Sinestro Corps during Year Two, and Sinestro to the remaining Guardians of the Universe at Oa for trial with a Green Lantern at the center of the court.

Miscellaneous
The Green Lantern Corps is featured in the Batman: The Brave and the Bold and Smallville Season 11 digital comic based on the TV series.

Literature
The Green Lantern Corps are reinterpreted as the Avant Guard in The Refrigerator Monologues.

Writers
The following writers have been involved in the ongoing Green Lantern Corps series:

Bibliography
This listing is for the "core" series or limited series to feature the Green Lantern Corps in their various incarnations over the years:
 Tales of the Green Lantern Corps (three-issue miniseries, May–July 1981)
 Tales of the Green Lantern Corps Annual #1 (1985) (first annual issue for Green Lantern (vol. 2) series)
 The Green Lantern Corps #201-224 (June 1986 – May 1988) (formerly Green Lantern (vol. 2) series; officially re-titled as The Green Lantern Corps (by cover only from #201-205) with #206 in the comic's legal indicia)
 Annuals #2 (Dec. 1986), #3 (Aug. 1987)
 Green Lantern Corps Quarterly #1-8 (Summer, 1992 - Spring, 1994)
 Green Lantern: The New Corps (two-issue miniseries, 1999)
 Green Lantern Corps: Recharge (five-issue miniseries, November 2005 - March 2006)
 Green Lantern Corps (vol. 2) #1 - 63 (August 2006 – August 2011)
 Green Lantern: Emerald Warriors #1 - 13 (October 2010 - October 2011)
 Green Lantern Corps (vol. 3) #1 - 40 (September 2011 – March 2015)

Collected editions

Green Lantern Corps vol. 1 
Some of the stories have been collected into trade paperbacks and hardcover:
 Tales of the Green Lantern Corps (collects Tales of the Green Lantern Corps #1-3 and back-up stories from Green Lantern (vol. 2) #148, 151-154, 161-162, 164-167), 160 pages, April 2009, DC Comics, March 2009, 
 Tales of the Green Lantern Corps Vol. 2 (collects back-up stories from Green Lantern (vol. 2) #168, 169, 171-173, 177, 179-183, 185, 187-190 and Tales of the Green Lantern Corps Annual #1), 144 pages, February 2010, 
 Tales of the Green Lantern Corps Vol. 3 (collects Green Lantern Corps #201-206), 144 pages, Oct. 2010,  
 Green Lantern Corps: Beware Their Power Vol. 1 (hardcover collects Green Lantern Corps #207-215 and Green Lantern Corps Annual #2-3). DC Comics, 296 pages, February 2018

Green Lantern Corps vol. 2 
 Recharge (collects five-issue limited series, June 2006)
 To Be a Lantern (collects Green Lantern Corps (vol. 2) #1-6, May 2007)
 The Dark Side of Green (collects Green Lantern Corps (vol. 2) #7-13, April 2008)
 Sinestro Corps War:
 Volume 1 (collects Green Lantern Corps (vol. 2) #14-15, Green Lantern (vol. 4) #21-23 and Green Lantern: Sinestro Corps Special one-shot, hardcover, February 2008, paperback, May 2009, DC Comics)
 Volume 2 (collects Green Lantern Corps (vol. 2) #16-19 and Green Lantern (vol. 4) #24-25, hardcover, July 2008, paperback, July 2009, DC Comics, June 2009)
 Ring Quest (collects Green Lantern Corps (vol. 2) #19-20, 23-26, January 2009, DC Comics, December 2008)
 Sins of the Star Sapphire (collects Green Lantern Corps (vol. 2) #27-32, July 2009, DC Comics, June 2009)
 Emerald Eclipse (collects Green Lantern Corps (vol. 2) #33-38, 160 pages, hardcover, November 2009, paperback, November 2010)
 Blackest Night: Green Lantern Corps (collects Green Lantern Corps (vol. 2) #39-47, 256 pages, hardcover, July 2010, paperback, July 2011)
 Revolt of the Alpha Lanterns (collects Green Lantern Corps (vol. 2) #21-22, 48-52, 176 pages, hardcover, May 2011, paperback, June 2012)
 The Weaponer (collects Green Lantern Corps (vol. 2) #53-57, 128 pages, hardcover, October 2011, paperback, October 2012)
 Green Lantern: Emerald Warriors (collects Green Lantern: Emerald Warriors #1-7, 176 pages, August 16, 2011)
 War of the Green Lanterns (collects Green Lantern (vol. 4) #63-67, Green Lantern Corps (vol. 2) #58-60, and Green Lantern: Emerald Warriors #8-10, 240 pages, hardcover, November 2011, paperback, September 2012)
 War of the Green Lanterns: Aftermath (collects Green Lantern Corps (vol. 2) #61-63, Green Lantern: Emerald Warriors #11-13, and War of the Green Lantern: Aftermath #1-2, 208 pages, hardcover, January 2012)

Green Lantern Corps vol. 3 (New 52) 
 Green Lantern Corps Vol. 1: Fearsome (collects Green Lantern Corps (vol. 3) #1-7, 160 pages, Hardcover, September 2012)
 Green Lantern Corps Vol. 2: Alpha War (collects Green Lantern Corps (vol. 3) #0, #8-14, 192 pages, Hardcover, July 2013)
 Green Lantern Corps Vol. 3: Willpower (collects Green Lantern Corps (vol. 3) #15-20, Green Lantern Corps Annual #1, 256 pages, Hardcover, December 10, 2013)
 Green Lantern : Rise of the Third Army (collects Green Lantern Annual #1, Green Lantern (vol. 5) #13-16, Green Lantern Corps (vol. 3) #13-16, Green Lantern: New Guardians #13-16, Red Lanterns #13-16, Green Lantern Corps Annual #1, 416 pages, Hardcover, September 10, 2013)
 Green Lantern: Wrath of the First Lantern (collects Green Lantern vol.5 #17-20, Green Lantern Corps Vol.3 #17-20, Green Lantern: New Guardians #17-20, Red Lanterns #17-20, 416 pages, Hardcover, February 25, 2014)
 Green Lantern Corps Vol. 4: Rebuild (collects Green Lantern Corps (vol. 3) #21-27, Green Lantern Corps Annual #2, 208 pages, Paperback, July 8, 2014)
 Green Lantern: Lights Out (collects Green Lantern #24, Green Lantern Corps #24, Green Lantern: New Guardians #23-24, Red Lanterns #24, Green Lantern Annual #2, Green Lantern #23.1: Relic, 192 pages, Hardcover, June 24, 2014)
 Green Lantern Corps Vol. 5: Uprising (collects Green Lantern Corps #28-34, Green Lantern Corps Annual #2 and Green Lantern #31-33)
 Green Lantern Corps Vol. 6: Reckoning (collects Green Lantern Corps issues #35-40)

See also
 List of Green Lanterns
 L.E.G.I.O.N.
 Sinestro Corps
 Nova Corps - A similar intergalactic organization in Marvel Comics

References

External links
 
 
 
 Green Lantern Corps at the DC Database
 Alan Kistler's profile on Green Lantern
 The Green Lantern Corps Web Page Great Book of Oa
 The Unofficial Green Lantern Corps Webpage
 Interview with Keith Champagne about the Green Lantern "Corpse" 

Characters created by John Broome
Characters created by Gil Kane
Comics by Peter J. Tomasi
Comics by Steve Englehart
Comics characters introduced in 1959
DC Comics aliens
DC Comics extraterrestrial superheroes
DC Comics superhero teams
DC Comics titles
DC Comics law enforcement agencies
Green Lantern characters
Fiction about intergalactic travel